Stellaria nitens is a species of flowering plant in the family Caryophyllaceae known by the common names shiny chickweed and shining starwort. It is native to western North America, including British Columbia, Alberta, and the western United States, its distribution extending into Mexico at least as far as Baja California. It grows in many types of habitat, in dry and moist areas, and sometimes in disturbed places. It is an annual herb producing a slender, upright, four-angled stem from a thin taproot, reaching up to about 25 centimeters in height. Most of the leaves are located low on the stem, each measuring up to 1.5 centimeters long, with smaller, narrower leaves occurring above. The leaves are hairless except for some rough hairs along the margins, and the blades have shiny surfaces. The inflorescence bears a few flowers on short pedicels. The flower has five pointed sepals each a few millimeters long. There are sometimes five tiny white petals as well, though these are often absent.

References

External links
Jepson Manual Treatment
Flora of North America
Washington Burke Museum
Photo gallery

nitens
Flora of Western Canada
Flora of the Northwestern United States
Flora of the Southwestern United States
Flora without expected TNC conservation status